Chalcosiinae is a subfamily of the Zygaenidae, containing many species, mostly little known. Prominent sexual dimorphism, bright aposematic coloration and mimicry complexes are widespread.

Several members of this subfamily remain relatively obscure, only being known from a single specimen, as in the case of the genus Isocrambia. Some others are known from specimens of a specific sex, such as Cyanidia and Allocaprima.

Distribution 
The members of Chalcosiinae are distributed throughout Palearctic East Asia, Southeast Asia, Melanesia, and Micronesia. The majority of the subfamily extending as far north as the Russian Far-East (Elcysma westwoodi) and as far west as Pakistan (Campylotes). A single genus, Aglaope is disjunctly distributed from the remainder of the subfamily, being found in the Iberian peninsula and Southern France.

Mimicry 
A large majority of Chalcosiine moths engage in mimicry complexes with a large variety of butterflies and moths. Yen Shen-Horn designates 19 unique types, separated by wing patterns which allow the ability to mimic a large variety of lepidopterans.

Species that are mimicked by Chalcosiine moths include:

Laelia, Pantana, Calinaga, Parantica, Aporia, Idea, Ideopsis, Euploea, Danaus, Delias, Eurema, Milionia, Scrobigera, Nyctemera, Dysphania, Lithosiinae, Sesiidae, Syntomini, Asota, Damias, Retina, Troidini, Melanothrix

Systematics

Alberti (1954) created five tribes within the subfamily. The five tribes only covered 40 genera, with the remaining 25 genera at the time lacking the proper material to warrant division. With this subfamily's notorious obscurity, and the relative variation between species and subspecies, the relationships between members is still quite indeterminate. S.H. Yen and team (2005) proposes 18 clades, with the Heteropanini being elevated to subfamily level. Clade 1 encompassing Agalopini and Aglaopini, Clade 2 encompassing an extended Cyclosiini, and Chalcosiini being the remainder of clades 6-18. As they describe, the nomenclature for this subfamily is currently unstable and is subject to further revision.

The subfamily consists of about 380 species in 70 genera. It contains the following genera

 Aglaopini 
Aglaope

 Agalopini 
Agalope
Boradia
Campylotes
Chalcophaedra
Corma
Elcysma
Herpa
Philopator
Rhodopsona

 Cyclosiini 
Cadphises
Cyclosia
Hampsonia

 Chalcosiini 
Amesia
Anarbudas
Aphantocephala
Caprima
Chalcosia
Docleopsis
Erasmia
Erasmiphlebohecta
Eterusia
Eusphalera
Gynautocera
Histia
Milleria
Pidorus
Pompelon
Prosopandrophila
Psaphis
Pseudarbudas
Pseudonyctemera
Pseudoscaptesyle
Retina
Soritia
Trypanophora

 Heteropanini 
Arbudas
Chalcosiopsis
Eumorphiopais
Heteropan

 Incertae sedis 
Achelura
Allocyclosia
Atelesia
Barbaroscia
Boradiopsis
Canerkes
Clematoessa
Cleoda
Codane
Cryptophysophilus
Cyanidia
Devanica
Didina
Docleomorpha
Epyrgis
Eucorma
Eucormopsis
Euxanthopyge
Hadrionella
Hemiscia
Hemichrysoptera
Herpidia
Herpolasia
Heteropanula
Heterusinula
Isbarta
Isocrambia
Laurion
Mimascaptesyle
Mimeuploea
Neochalcosia
Neoherpa
Opisoplatia
Panherpina
Phlebohecta
Pintia
Sciodoclea
Scotopais
Thaumastophleps
Watermenia

Gallery

References

 
Aposematic animals